An eco-action is any action or activity within a program that is intended to have a positive impact on the environment. For this reason it is often used as a synonym for environmental action. 
People adopting eco-actions tend to target activities around the ‘Three Rs’ of the waste hierarchy, Reducing, Reusing and Recycling. They may decide to carry out small-scale eco-friendly actions such as reducing the volume of paper used in offices, or purchasing products only from companies that have environmentally friendly or sustainability policies. Others may adopt eco-actions that affect where they live by cleaning up beaches, removing graffiti, supporting community gardening, and re-planting coastal wetlands because the immediate community has come to be considered part of their ecosystem.

Widening trend
Eco-action groups tend to be small and unstructured but as their influence grows, their ideas are being co-opted by environmental action groups, sometimes backed by non-governmental organizations (NGOs) like Worldwatch Institute, and those that are part of larger alliances such as the Clean Water Network.

There has been a recent trend where eco-actions have begun attracting leadership from a national standpoint with several governments stepping in. Canada’s “EcoAction Community Funding program” encourages inner city residents to take actions that improve their communities. The government of Japan backs companies that reward citizens with “eco action points” when they take positive action toward the environment.  Industries have begun adopt eco-labels too. The Marine Stewardship Council adopted its own label for commercial and non-commercial use, with specific guidelines. Such emerging interest has been supplemented by the development of measurement tools that can evaluate and track such individual or group behavior over time. The best examples of this development are the emergence of ecological footprint calculators such as carbon footprint and water footprint calculators, and new mapping tools. As interest in eco-action grows we will see consumers demand for better ecolabeling, and standardized eco-certification programs.

References 

Environmentalism